Michael Guiney's Ltd, more commonly known and referred to as Guiney's, is an Irish department store founded in June 1971. The store specialises in homewares, menswear, womenswear and children's clothing. They have 11 stores in the Republic of Ireland located in Dublin, Limerick, Waterford, Castlebar, Tralee, Cork, Clonmel, Mullingar, Kilkenny, and, as of December 2018, Castle Place in central Belfast, Northern Ireland. It is well known for having its two Dublin stores within sight of each other - one on North Earl Street and one on Talbot Street, which run directly into each other off O'Connell Street. The company was solely Dublin based from 1971 until 1992, when a branch in Cork was opened. Other branches followed in Tralee and Waterford (2004).

The Limerick store was opened in late 2004, occupying the long vacant anchor tenancy of what was previously the Williamscourt Mall on William Street. The Castlebar store opened in December 2008. A store was opened in Clonmel in December 2013. Guiney's launched their online store in 2012 which delivers to homes and businesses in the Republic of Ireland, and the Mullingar and Kilkenny stores opened in 2015. The store that opened in December 2018 at Castle Place in central Belfast was the first Guiney's anywhere in the nine counties of Ulster, and is located in a 21,000 sq ft unit which once housed a branch of BHS (British Home Stores) until August 2016.

Michael Guiney
Michael Guiney came from Limerick and had been working for his uncle Denis Guiney as the buyer of household goods and furnishings at Clerys, before setting up his own Dublin store under the Guineys name in 1971. For many years there were three shops on Dublin’s Talbot Street all with the name Guiney in the name, as Michael's stores were joined on the street by Guineys & Co at 79-80 Talbot Street, set up by Clerys/Denis Guiney and in operation until 2012.

Stores
As of 2022 Guineys has twelve stores located in Leinster, Munster, Connacht & Ulster, with two in Dublin.
Guineys Belfast
Guineys Castlebar
Guineys Clonmel
Guineys Dublin (North Earl Street and Talbot Street)
Guineys Dundalk
Michael Guineys Cork
Guineys Kilkenny
Guineys Limerick
Guineys Mullingar
Guineys Tralee
Guineys Waterford

External links
 Guineys Official website

See Also
 Clerys (a department store group, bought by Kerry businessman Denis Guiney in the 1940s, which once owned the similarly named Guiney and Co store at 79-80 Talbot Street, Dublin)

References

Department stores of Ireland
Retail companies of Ireland
Companies based in Dublin (city)
Clothing retailers of Ireland
Irish companies established in 1971
Retail companies established in 1971